Waverly-Shell Rock Senior High School is a public senior high school located in Waverly, Iowa, United States. It provides high school education for Waverly and surrounding areas in Bremer County.

Organization
The school is part of the Waverly-Shell Rock Community School District. The current principal is David Fox. Education is provided in grades 9–12. As of the 2010–11 school year it had an enrolment of 671 students, 96% of whom were White.

Athletics
The Go-Hawks compete in the Northeast Iowa Conference in the following sports:

Cross Country
Volleyball 
Football 
Basketball 
The Go-Hawks won the Class 3A boys' basketball state title in 2007 and 2013.

Waverly-Shell Rock has had two players win the Iowa Mr. Basketball award as the best high school boys basketball player in Iowa: Mike Bergman in 1989, and Clayton Vette in 2007.

Bowling
Wrestling
Track and Field 
Golf 
Baseball 
Softball

Controversy
During a baseball game between Waverly-Shell Rock High and Charles City High School on June 29th, 2020, individuals from Waverly-Shell Rock High were heard insulting an African-American teenager on the opposing team with overtly and unapologetic racist taunts. After an investigation, the district has stated “appropriate measures” will be taken. Citing a pattern of unsportsmanlike behavior among Waverly-Shell Rock fans, Charles City requested a one-year break from games against the Go-Hawks, and is considering leaving the conference.

Notable alumni
 Paul Stumme-Diers, (born 1960), was a bishop of the Evangelical Lutheran Church in America.

See also
List of high schools in Iowa

References

External links
 

Waverly, Iowa
Public high schools in Iowa
Schools in Bremer County, Iowa